Fujairah Free Zone (FFZ) is a special economic zone in Fujairah, which is one of the seven emirates that comprise the United Arab Emirates. Fujairah Free Zone is located just north of the emirate's capital, Fujairah City. It is run by the Fujairah Free Zone Authority (FFZA).

Overview
The free zone provides a tax-free environment for companies in Fujairah.

Close by are the Fujairah Oil Industry Zone and the Port of Fujairah on the coast providing access to the Gulf of Oman and the Indian Ocean. There are cargo air links via Fujairah International Airport to the south of Fujairah City. The area is also known as Sakamkam and nearby is the historic Sakamkam Fort.

Creative City is another free zone in Fujairah.

See also
 Creative City
 Port of Fujairah
 Fujairah International Airport

References

Creative City-Fujairah

External links
 Fujairah Free Zone website

Year of establishment missing
Companies based in the Emirate of Fujairah
Economy of the Emirate of Fujairah
Geography of the Emirate of Fujairah
Free-trade zones of the United Arab Emirates
Fujairah City